Thomas Jack Windle (born 1998/1999) is an English footballer who plays college soccer for the Florida Tech Panthers, as a defender.

Early and personal life
Windle attended Water Street Primary School in Skipton and Settle College.

Career
He joined Bradford City at the age of 11, after being spotted playing for local side LMS in Skipton. He made 3 senior appearances for the club in the EFL Trophy during the 2016–17 season. He left the club after seven years, and in 2018 obtained a scholarship for Tyler Junior College. After two years he moved to Florida Institute of Technology.

Career statistics

References

1990s births
Living people
English footballers
Bradford City A.F.C. players
Association football defenders
English expatriate footballers
English expatriate sportspeople in the United States
Expatriate soccer players in the United States
Florida Tech Panthers men's soccer players
Tyler Apaches men's soccer players